The Dominican Republic participated at the 2017 Summer Universiade in Taipei, Taiwan with 29 competitors in 5 sports. The flag bearer was sprinter Luguelín Santos.

Medal summary

Athletics 

Key
Note– Ranks given for track events are within the athlete's heat only
Q = Qualified for the next round
q = Qualified for the next round as a fastest loser or, in field events, by position without achieving the qualifying target
N/A = Round not applicable for the event

Men
Track & road events

Women
Track & road events

Gymnastics

Artistic 
Men

Women

Judo

Men

Women

Taekwondo

Weightlifting

References

External links
Dominican Republic 2017 Universiade General Info

Nations at the 2017 Summer Universiade
2017 in Dominican Republic sport
Dominican Republic at the Summer Universiade